The Richard J. Coffee Mercer County Park is a recreational park located in Mercer County, New Jersey – mostly within West Windsor Township, but also with small western sections extending into Hamilton and Lawrence Townships.  Originally and still more commonly known as simply Mercer County Park, it was renamed for New Jersey State Senator Richard J. Coffee on October 15, 2009.  The park encompasses over  covering much of southern West Windsor, with portions extending into adjacent Hamilton and Lawrence.  Mercer Lake, located within the park, is the home for the US Olympic Rowing Team's training center. The National Softball Association honored the Mercer County Park Commission with its "Outstanding Parks Award" for the softball fields and facilities in Mercer County Park.  It has served as the home field for the New Jersey Pride of the Major League Lacrosse for one game in 2004, 2005 and 2006. It has also hosted semi-professional Minor League Cricket matches.

History 

The land was acquired between the late 1960s and the early 1970s. It consists of 50-plus pieces of property, which included many farms. Ground was broken for the park in June 1971.  Because of the construction of Routes I-95 and I-295, the lake basin was excavated and paid for by selling gravel to the highway contractors, which in turn helped excavate the basin now known as Lake Mercer.

Facilities 
36 holes of golf (Mercer Oaks East and West)
 Seventeen athletic fields used for soccer, football, and lacrosse
 Ice skating center (home to the Mercer Bulldogs special hockey team )
 Tennis center (24 total courts - six of which are covered and are lit)
 Cross country course
 Mountain biking area
 Boat house/marina
 Finn Caspersen Rowing Center
 Crew course
 Nature trail
 Fishing
 Hiking and jogging area
 3-mile paved trail
 Picnic areas
 Dog parks
Frisbee golf course
 Three sand volleyball courts
 Two cricket pitches
 Seven basketball courts
 Ten softball fields
 Veterans Memorial Park
 Parking facilities
 Seven washrooms
 9/11 Memorial - A steel beam weighing one ton and ten feet long was given to the county by the Port Authority of New York and New Jersey in March 2011 and is now displayed at Mercer County Park to commemorate the deceased Mercer County victims that died during the September 11, 2001 terrorist attacks in Lower Manhattan

References

External links
Mercer Bulldogs Official Website
"Mercer County Park", Mercer County, New Jersey

County parks in New Jersey
Park
Dog parks in the United States
West Windsor, New Jersey
Former Major League Lacrosse venues